State Route 659 in Loudoun and Prince William Counties, Virginia is a secondary state highway. Otherwise known as Belmont Ridge Road north of Arcola, and Gum Spring Road to the south, the road is heavily used by commuters in the suburbs and bedroom communities of Loudoun County.

Geography and layout

The road’s actual northern terminus is the Nation Conference Center just off the shores of the Potomac River, but for all practical uses of the road, the northern terminus is Route 7. The southern terminus is State Route 234 just past the Loudoun-Prince William County border. There are two Luck Stone quarries along Route 659, one outside the community of Belmont Green just southeast of Leesburg, and another just inside the Loudoun side of the county border near Route 234. The expansion of the southern quarry led to the relocation of a portion of the route in May 2012.

History

The origin of the road's path is unclear (possibly the road had been a colonial byway, but no specific evidence is available to back up this assumption), but the road has been used by Loudoun County residents for years.

Future improvements

The road has been scheduled for improvements under the Loudoun County Countywide Transportation Plan. Between Route 7 in Loudoun and Croson Lane, the road will have an ultimate condition of six lanes. The other parts of the road have an ultimate condition of four lanes. As of 2022, the road has been widened to four lanes from State Route 7 (Harry Byrd Highway) to State Route 621 (Evergreen Mills Road). Additionally, a stretch south of U.S. Route 50 to Marbury Estates Drive has also been widened to four lanes.

Major intersections

References

659 Loudoun and Prince William
State Route 659
State Route 659
Transportation in Prince William County, Virginia